The 2020 European Short Track Speed Skating Championships were held from 24 to 26 January 2020 at the Főnix Hall in Debrecen, Hungary.

Medal summary

Medal table

Men's events

Women's events

References

External links
Official website 
Results
Results book

European Short Track Speed Skating Championships
World Championships
European Short Track Speed Skating Championships
International speed skating competitions hosted by Hungary
Sport in Debrecen
European Short Track Speed Skating Championships